Wolf Creek is a stream in the U.S. state of Georgia. It is a tributary to Rocky Creek.

Wolf Creek most likely was so named by a surveyor for wolves in the area.

References

Rivers of Georgia (U.S. state)
Rivers of Bibb County, Georgia